Beniamino Cavicchioni (27 December 1836 – 17 April 1911) was an Italian cardinal of the Catholic Church. He was a papal diplomat and worked in the Roman Curia.

Biography
He was born in Pago Veiano, Italy, on 27 December 1836. He was ordained a priest on 18 December 1859.

He worked on the staff of the Congregation for the Propagation of the Faith with particular responsibility for the United States.

On 21 March 1884, Pope Leo XIII appointed him titular archbishop of Amida and Apostolic Delegate to Bolivia, Ecuador, and Peru. He received his episcopal consecration on 27 April from Cardinal Luigi Serafini.

He returned to Rome in 1889 and worked in the Roman Curia.

Pope Leo XIII made him Cardinal-Priest of Santa Maria in Ara Coeli in the consistory held on 22 June 1903.

From 11 March 1910 he was Prefect of the Congregation for Religious Studies.

Cavicchioni underwent surgery and died a few days later on 17 April 1911 in Rome.

References

1836 births
1911 deaths
People from the Province of Benevento
Apostolic Nuncios to Bolivia
Apostolic Nuncios to Ecuador
Apostolic Nuncios to Peru
Officials of the Roman Curia
Cardinals created by Pope Leo XIII